Shaun Davies is an Aboriginal Australian language activist, linguist, radio personality, and actor. He is known for his advocacy work with the Yugambeh language and culture, as well as appearances in various media.

Early and personal life
Shaun is a member of the Yugambeh people, an Australian Aboriginal group whose traditional lands are located in South East Queensland and the Northern Rivers area of New South Wales. Davies is the great-great-grandson of Julia Ford née Sandy (c.1860-1896), an Aboriginal woman who has the sole tombstone in the Deebing Creek Aboriginal Cemetery; Julia was a native Aboriginal woman from the Southport area of the Gold Coast and married Arthur Ford (c.1866-1954) at Nerang in 1883, Arthur was an Aboriginal man from the Murwillumbah region in northern New South Wales. Shaun grew up and has spent the majority of his life in Logan City, an area his family had lived in before the arrival of Europeans. As a child, he was taught Yugambeh dreamtime legends from his Elders, such as that of the janjarri (the Yugambeh Yowie), a spirit that guards the region from trespassers. As creative, Davies uses stories passed from his family line to increase awareness and appreciation for his traditional culture and language.

While in tenth grade Shaun attended a career expo at the Brisbane Showgrounds, becoming fascinated with a booth set up by Youth For Understanding Davies subsequently did a 3-month student exchange program in France where he discovered his passion for endangered languages, like Galician. Upon returning to Australia and informing his grandmother Joan and her sister, they implored him to learn their lingo. Shaun learnt his Yugambeh language from his maternal grandmother, who was from the Beaudesert area, while his maternal grandfather was from Tweed Heads.  Davies has recorded talk in conversations with the linguist Margaret Sharpe, his grandmother grew up with Joe Culham, who Sharpe (then Cunningham) had recorded language from in 1968.

In his spare time, Shaun enjoys the Star Trek: Discovery series, finding the show's Xenolinguistics and other themes thought-provoking.

Career
Shaun is a linguist and the Language Research Officer at the Yugambeh Museum Language and Heritage Research Centre, where he has been since 2015. Describing social media as the new "campfire" and technology's central importance in keeping Indigenous languages alive for future generations, Davies has worked with Snapchat, aided the development and expansion of the Yugambeh App, and the creation of Google's 'Woolaroo'  an open-source photo-translation platform.

He has written/translated songs for the Yugambeh Youth choir. and provided Yugambeh interpretations for Ellen van Neerven's poetry. Davies is an activist for Aboriginal language, and has advocated for the use of Indigenous place names over their contemporary English names, calling for Burleigh Heads and Mt Warning to be known by their Yugambeh names, Jellurgal and Wollumbin. This was opposed by Australian senator Pauline Hanson, while the Member for Burleigh, Michael Hart, was in favour so long as it was solely landmarks. Hanson subsequently featured the discussion on her Please Explain YouTube channel. Shaun hosted Learn the Lingo on ABC Gold Coast - a radio show discussing Yugambeh language and other cultural subjects from 2015 to 2017, and in 2019 appeared in the State Library of Queensland's Spoken exhibition discussing his personal history with the Yugambeh language. Alongside Cameron Dick in 2018, Shaun opened Siemens' Fusesaver facility in Yatala, delivering a Welcome to Country.

In 2020, Davies had a voice over role in the Australian Broadcasting Corporation's Yugambeh language series Languages of our Land, as well as appearing in Disney's Spread the Word. The following year, he appeared in the ABC documentary series Back to Nature where he guided the hosts through the Yugambeh language and stories associated with the Springbrook area. Shaun is involved in protecting Yugambeh cultural heritage and land, being part of the consultation for the Gold Coast Light Rail construction's at Jebbribillum Bora Ring and a Cultural Heritage Coordinator, he is also the treasurer of the Yugambeh Land Enterprises, and elected Representative for the Birinburra clan and Native Title applicant. In late 2021, Davies was announced as an ambassador for the Proud City of Logan campaign, a local government initiative featuring six local champions, chosen to represent the diversity of people and lifestyles in the city. He was part of the official opening of Screen Forever 36, and Tourism and Events Queensland's annual DestinationQ Forum in 2022, where he conducted the Welcome to Countries. Shaun denounced the Morrison government's 2022 High Court challenge to the precedent established in Love v Commonwealth that Aboriginal Australians (understood according to the 3-part test in Mabo v Queensland (No 2)) are not within the reach of the Commonwealth's "aliens" power, Davies called the Government's actions a step backwards for Australia that undermined the foundations of Aboriginal identity. Following the 2022 Australian federal election, Shaun praised the newly elected Albanese government's decision to dismiss the case, allowing Love to remain precedent.

Later that year he guest starred in an episode of No Offence! on the ABC.

Filmography

Radio

Television series

Film

Bibliography
 Davies, S. (2022, 27 May - 3 June). Token Politics: The Semiotics of Yugambeh-Bundjalung Ethnonyms [Conference presentation]. Australian Institute for Aboriginal and Torres Strait Islander Studies Summit 2022, Noosa, Qld, Australia.
 Davies, S. (2022, 8 July - 10 July). Your language is dead: Go learn Bundjalung — Those who said Yugambeh [Conference presentation]. Australian Languages Workshop 2022, Dunwich, Queensland: Australian Research Council Centre of Excellence for the Dynamics of Language. pp. 1–19.

See also

 Yugambeh language
 Yugambeh people
 Jebribillum Bora Park
 Logan City, Queensland

Citations

References

External links
 
 Shaun Davies - ABC Classic

Living people
Australian activists
Linguists from Australia
Year of birth missing (living people)